The  is a railway line connecting Oyama Station in Tochigi Prefecture and Tomobe Station in Ibaraki Prefecture, Japan.

Joban Line E501 series and E531 series ten car sets continue on to Iwaki, Fukushima while the 5 car sets go to Oyama. They separate at Tomobe.

Station list 
 All trains stop at every station.
 Trains can pass one another at stations marked "◇" and "∨" and cannot pass at stations marked "｜".

Rolling stock
 E501 series five-car EMUs
 E531 series five-car EMUs

Former rolling stock
 415 series four-car EMUs (until March 2016)

History 

The Mito Railway Co. opened the line on 16 January 1889 operating between Oyama and Mito Stations. On 1 March 1892, the Mito Railway Co. merged with the Nippon Railway.

On 1 July 1895, the Joban Line was opened by the Nippon Railway, joining the Mito Line at Tomobe Station. The company was nationalised in 1906.

On 12 October 1909, the Japanese Government Railways renamed the Tomobe to Mito section as part of the Joban Line, resulting in the current "Mito Line" being the section between Oyama and Tomobe.

The line was completely electrified on 1 February 1967.

Former connecting lines

Kasama Station: A 1.4 km  gauge handcar line to the Kasama Inari shrine operated between 1915 and 1930.

References

External links

 Stations of the Mito Line (JR East) 

 
Lines of East Japan Railway Company
Rail transport in Ibaraki Prefecture
Rail transport in Tochigi Prefecture
1067 mm gauge railways in Japan
Railway lines opened in 1889